Brian Michael "Q" Quinn (born March 14, 1976) is an American podcaster, improvisational comedian, and actor. He is a member of The Tenderloins, a comedy troupe also consisting of Sal Vulcano, James Murray, and formerly Joe Gatto. Along with the other members of The Tenderloins, he stars in the television series Impractical Jokers, which premiered on December 15, 2011, on TruTV.

Early life 
Quinn was born on March 14, 1976, in the borough of Brooklyn in New York City, but moved to Staten Island before he was two years old. He is of Irish and Italian ancestry. Quinn attended Monsignor Farrell High School. Along with Murray, Vulcano, and Gatto, he was a member of his high school's Improvisation Club. He studied at Brooklyn College before joining the New York City Fire Department, where he served for eight years.

Career

Early career 
Despite not being an initial member of his friends' comedy troupe The Tenderloins, after one of the original members, Mike Boccio, left the group in 2006, Quinn became the troupe's then-fourth member.

The Tenderloins began producing comedy sketches together, posting them on YouTube, Myspace, and Metacafe, accumulating millions of views online. In 2007, the troupe won the $100,000 grand prize in the NBC It's Your Show competition for the sketch "Time Thugs".

Impractical Jokers and other television shows 
Impractical Jokers premiered on December 15, 2011, on TruTV. The first season was watched by over 32 million viewers. The show quickly became the most popular series on TruTV, and has boosted Quinn into the public eye.

In 2019, Quinn, along with the other members of The Tenderloins, starred in The Misery Index, which is hosted by Jameela Jamil and is based on Andy Breckman's card game "Shit Happens".

Quinn was in the 6th episode of Tacoma F.D., 'Full Moon Fever', released May 2, 2019.

Impractical Jokers: The Movie was released on February 21, 2020.

Quinn had a cameo in the first episode of the second season of 12 Monkeys, which first aired in the US on April 18, 2016.

Quinn also had a cameo in the fourth episode of the second season of Star Trek: Picard, which first aired in the US on March 25, 2022.

Podcasts

Tell 'Em Steve-Dave 
Quinn is also a co-host of the podcast Tell 'Em Steve-Dave!, which he hosts with Bryan Johnson and Walt Flanagan. The podcast started in February 2010 with Quinn in the role of the off-mic audio engineer, then shortly after as occasional commentator and ultimately co-host.

The Tenderloins Podcast 
The group began hosting a podcast in April 2012. It is available on their official website and iTunes.

What Say You? 
What Say You?, an occasional podcast hosted by Sal Vulcano and Quinn, was named Best New Show at the 2013 Stitcher Awards. The increased popularity of What Say You sparked a friendly competition among the comedians, spurring Joe Gatto and James Murray to release their own Tenderloins podcast without the other two members. In 2015, What Say You? was nominated for the Comedy, Entertainment, and Best Produced Podcast Awards at the 10th Annual Podcast Awards. Vulcano and Quinn have stated that the podcast is their own side project, not a replacement of The Tenderloins Podcast. The group explained that it was difficult to coordinate the schedules of all four members outside of work, making it challenging to produce their troupe's official podcast with any regularity.

Personal life 
Quinn suffers from arachnophobia. He has two cats, Brooklyn and Chessie. Along with that, he has a tattoo that says, "38. Lives alone. Has 3 cats" from the result of a triple punishment on Impractical Jokers. Quinn suffers from depression, and has been very open about his struggles throughout the years.

While taking a trip to Germany in 2009, Quinn was arrested for disorderly conduct while visiting Oktoberfest. An assailant punched him in the face, knocking his tooth out. Quinn was escorted back to the United States by German police, and was bailed out by his Tenderloins troupe members.

Since his time on Impractical Jokers, Quinn has donated $50,000 to the New York City Fire Department, and he occasionally meets with his former coworkers.

In 2019, Quinn revived the Rubsam & Horrmann Brewing Company on Staten Island and launched their signature beer titled "Q's Brews".

Quinn is a Kentucky Colonel.

References

External links 
 

1976 births
Living people
21st-century American comedians
American people of Irish descent
American people of Italian descent
Brooklyn College alumni
Comedians from New York City
Monsignor Farrell High School alumni
New York City firefighters
People from Brooklyn
People from Staten Island
The Tenderloins